David Rosenberg (born 3 November 1965) is a French art curator and author, specialized in modern and contemporary art.

Biography 
David Rosenberg has curated exhibitions and organized art events in France and internationally in collaboration with museums and foundations. 

In his works, he has explored relations between art and different disciplines — such as science, new technologies, dance, and studied connections between art and comic strip or manga. He has also done work around the history of photography and the record of invention (neon light).

In 2003, he founded "Le Dancing", a group of European dancers and choreographers performing offstage, in collaboration with plastic artists and artistic groups.

In 2004, he contributed to "The Quiet in the Land, Art, Spirituality and Everyday life", Luang Prabang, Laos, created and directed by France Morin.

From 2004 to 2012, he was a faculty member in the Art department at the University of Paris VIII.

In 2014 he was named Knight of the Order of the Arts and Letters.

Exhibitions and events (selection) 
 Gold Water: Apocalyptic Black Mirrors II, MACRO Museum, Rome, in collaboration with Paolo De Grandis et Claudio Crescentini. March/April 2016. Artist: Maria Veronica Leon V.     
 Mattotti / Infini. Fonds Hélène & Édouard Leclerc pour la Culture (Hélène & Edouard Leclerc foundation for the Culture), Capucins, Landerneau, in collaboration with Lucas Hureau. December, 2015.
 Hard Rain. Feizi Gallery, Brussels. November, 2015.
 Showcase #1: Think Big as part of Parcours Privé FIAC 2015, Beaugrenelle, Paris, in collaboration with Constance Breton (The Art of this Century). October, 2015.
 Dédicaces et déclarations (Dedications and declarations). Exhibition at Cognacq-Jay Museum as part of the #05 Yia Art Fair Hors les Murs, in collaboration with Marie Gayet. October, 2015.
 Mille fleurs ! (A thousand flowers!). A Chinese art collection. Sainte-Anne chapel, La Baule. July, 2015.  
 Inside Tesla. Feizi Gallery, Brussels. April, 2015.
 Silent Conversation. Feizi Gallery, Brussels. March, 2015.
 Screens. Feizi Gallery, Brussels. September, 2015.
 Obscur — Clarté (Obscur — clarity). As part of the #02 YIA Art Fair, Bastille Design Center, Paris. March, 2015.
 Metamorphosis of the Virtual 5+5. K11 Shanghai, Shanghai. July, 2014.  
 Genesis (Hyundai showroom). Beyond Museum, Seoul, Korea. December, 2014.  
 Holistic, Mario Mazzoli Gallery, Berlin. May 2014. Artist: Donato Piccolo.
 Endre Rozsda : le temps retrouvé (Endre Rozsda: time regained). Retrospective exhibition of the centenary of the birth of the artist. In collaboration with Rona Kopeczky and Péter Baki. Magyar Nemzeti Galéria (Hungarian National Gallery), Budapest. November, 2013.
 Je sème à tout vent… 11 galeries parisiennes en fleur (I sow to the four winds...11 flowering Parisian galleries).  May, 2013.
 Turbulences II. Boghossian Foundation, in partnership with the Louis Vuitton cultural space, Brussels, February, 2013, in collaboration with Pierre Sterckx.
 Éric Michel, Aura. Hôtel-Dieu, Brie-Comte-Robert. December, 2012.
 Neon, la materia luminosa dell’arte MACRO Museum, Rome, in collaboration with Bartolomeo Pietromarchi. June, 2012.
 Turbulences. Louis Vuitton cultural space, Paris, in collaboration with Pierre Sterckx. June, 2012.  
 Néon ! Who’s afraid of red, yellow and blue ?. La Maison Rouge, Antoine de Galbert foundation. February, 2012.
 L’Étrange Noël de Monsieur et Madame de la Châtre(The Nightmare Before Christmas of Mr and Mrs de la Châtre). Martine et Thibault de la Châtre Gallery, Paris. December, 2011.
 Charwei Tsai, « My Nature ». Maison Deyrolle, Paris. May, 2011.
 Fabien Verschaere, Lost & Found Galerie RX, Paris. April, 2011.
 Contemplation/Contestation, a Chinese art collection. Neuflize OBC Bank, Paris. October, 2010.  
 Mantras, moqueries, monstres et mutations (Youpi, c’est la rentrée ! chapter II) (Mantras, mockeries, monsters and mutations). Martine et Thibault de la Châtre Gallery, Paris. September, 2010.
 Deichû Ni Hasu (a Lotus in the Mud), Underground & Secret Mangaka. Georges-Philippe et Nathalie Vallois Gallery, Paris. April, 2010.
 Show, Vlad et Alina Turco, École des Beaux-Arts de Paris, Paris. January, 2010.
 La photographie n’est pas l’art, collection Sylvio Perlstein (Photography is not art, Sylvio Perlstein collection)Museum of Ixelles, Brussels. October, 2009 / Museum of Modern and Contemporary Art of Strasbourg, Strasbourg, in collaboration with Régis Durand. February, 2010.   
 Sam Samore, Schizophrenic Portrait, 1973-2009, a survey. Anne de Villepoix Gallery, Paris. September, 2009.
 Youpi, c’est la rentrée ! Martine et Thibault de la Châtre Gallery, Paris. September, 2009.
 Vraoum ! bande-dessinée et art contemporain (Vraoum ! Comic strip and contemporary art). La Maison Rouge, Antoine de Galbert foundation, in collaboration with Pierre Sterckx. May, 2009.
 Jean-Marc Bustamante, Pedigree;  Filomena Soares Gallery, Lisbon. January, 2009.
 Curating Contest, 16 curators, 16 propositions. La Louisiane hotel. Olivier Robert Gallery, Paris. December, 2007. Artists: Vlad & Alina Turco.
 Zan Jbai, Nothing happened / Nothing to tell you. Kamel Mennour Gallery, Paris. June, 2007.
 An Xiaotong, Absolute Images. Espace Saint-Honoré, Paris. February, 2007
 Busy going crazy, Sylvio Perlstein collection, art and photography from Dada to nowadays. La Maison Rouge, Antoine de Galbert foundation, Paris. October, 2006.
 Paper, Wallpaper, Plants & Venilia. Quang Gallery, Paris. January, 2005.
 Camila Oliveira Fairclough, Marie-Gabrielle Lou, Sylvain Rousseau & Olivier Babin. Heartgalerie, Paris. July, 2004.
 L’expérience intérieure (Inner experience) (dance, poetry, installations, photography). Heartgalerie, Paris. June, 2004. 
 Chen Zhen, “Silence sonore” (Chen Zhen, "Audible silence"). Performance and musical interpretation of “Jue Chang — Dancing Body / Drumming Mind (The Last Song)”. Palais de Tokyo, contemporary creation site, Paris. October, 2003.  
 Le dancing III. Choreographic performance for the 30th anniversary of FIAC, Maxim’s, Paris. October, 2003.  
 Le Dancing II. Choreographic performance as part of the presentation of the contemporary photography collection of NSMD – ABN AMRO – Centre national de la photographie (National Photography Center), Paris. July, 2003.  
 Le Dancing (choreographers and plastic artists), Michel Rein Gallery, Paris. May, 2003.
 Prière(s) (Prayers), co-curator and co-author of the catalogue, in collaboration with Pascal Bonafoux, Musée d’art et d’histoire de Saint-Denis (Museum of Art and History of Saint-Denis), Saint-Denis. March, 2002.  Endre Rozsda, l’œuvre graphique, rétrospective (Endre Rozda, graphic work, retrospective).  co-curator of the exhibition, editor of Budapest National Gallery, Budapest. June, 2001.
 Endre Rozsda, l’œuvre peint, rétrospective (Endre Rozda, painted work, retrospective).   co-curator of the exhibition, editor of Mucsarnok Palace, Budapest. May, 1998.

Publications (selection) 
 Umberto Mariani, Skira, Milano, to be published, 2016.
 Mattotti / Infini, FHEL, Landerneau, 2015
 Metamorphosis of the virtual, K11, Shanghai, 2014
 Endre Rozsda : Le temps retrouvé (with Rona Kopeczky and Peter Baki), MNG Budapest, 2013 (catalogue)
 Turbulences II, (with Pierre Sterckx), Fondation Boghossian, Brussels, 2013 (catalogue)
 Les Nouveaux horizons de l’architecture, Assouline, Paris, 2013
 Turbulences (with Pierre Sterckx), Espace culturel Louis Vuitton, Paris, 2012 (catalogue)
 Neon, la materia luminosa dell’arte, Quodlibet, Rome, 2012 (catalogue)
 Néon, Archibooks / la maison rouge, Paris, 2012 (catalogue)
 Les Nouveaux horizons du design, Assouline, Paris, 2012
 Yang Yongliang, Thircuir, Beijing, 2011
 Pascal Haudressy, Skira, Milano, 2011
 Les Nouveaux horizons de l’art, Assouline, Paris, 2011
 Kata Legrady, Bombs and Candies, Skira, Milano, 2011
 Contemplation / Contestation, Une collection d’art contemporain chinois, Trocadéro, Paris, 2010 (catalogue)
 Art Game Book, Histoire des Arts du 20e siècle, Assouline, Paris, 2010
 La Photographie n’est pas l’art, Collection Sylvio Perlstein (with Régis Durand), Musée d’Ixelles and Musées de Strasbourg, 2009 (catalogue)
 Jean-Marc Bustamante, Pedigree, Filomena Soares Gallery, Lisbon, 2009 (catalogue)
 Vraoum ! Bande-dessinée & art contemporain (with Pierre Sterckx), Fage & La maison rouge, Paris, 2009 (catalogue)
 Collection Sylvio Perlstein, Ludion, Gand, 2006
 Busy going crazy, collection Sylvio Perlstein, Fage et La maison rouge, Paris 2006   (catalogue)
 Christofle, Assouline, Paris, 2005
 Louvre Game Book, Assouline, Paris, 2005
 Wake Up, Damien Dufresne, Assouline, Paris, 2004
 Chen Zhen, Invocation of Washing Fire, éd. Gli Ori, Siena-Prato, Italy, 2003. Directed by David Rosenberg and Xu Min 
 Art Game Book, Histoire des Arts du XXème siècle, Assouline, Paris, 2003
 Manoli, l’élan, la rencontre, monographie, Somogy, Paris, 2003
 Rozsda, l’œil en fête, Somogy, Paris, 2002. Directed by David Rosenberg. Texts by: Sarane Alexandrian, Dominique Desanti, Péter Esterhazy, Françoise Gilot, Édouard Jaguer, Érik Orsenna, André Breton and Joyce Mansour.
 Endre Rozsda, l’œuvre graphique, Budapest National Gallery, 2001. Directed by David Rosenberg. Texts by : Sarane Alexandrian, Péter Esterhazy, François Fejtö, Françoise Gilot and Gabor Pataki (catalogue in French/Hungarian).
 Endre Rozsda, Mucsarnok, Budapest, 1998. Directed by David Rosenberg. Texts by: Érik Orsenna, Dr. Krisztina Passuth, interview with Endre Rozsda by David Rosenberg (catalogue in French/Hungarian).

Contributions and collective works 
 Boris Lurie, Ed. Galerie Odile Ouizemann & Boris Lurie art Fondation, Paris, 2016
 Thinking Outside the Box / Andrei Proletski, Ed. Museum Haus Konstruktiv, Zurich, 2016
 Nicolas de Crécy, MEL Publisher, Paris, 2016
 Kata Legrady: Once upon a time…, Skira, Milano, 2014
 André Brasilier, Skira, Milano, 2014
 Miguel Chevalier, Power Pixels, CDA Enghien, Écritures Numériques, 2013
 Les Métamorphoses du Virtuel, Venice, 2013
 Kata Legrady, Mudima, Skira, Milano, 2013
 Lorenzo Fernandez, Gal. Taménaga, Paris, 2012
 A History of Contemporary Chinese Photography, Gal. Paris-Beijing, Paris, 2012
 Kata Legrady, Guns & Masks, Paris, 2011
 La Maison Rouge 2004-2009, Paris, 2010
 Philippe Pasqua, Paradise, Skira, Milano, 2010
 Gao Brothers, Galerie Vallois, Paris, 2008
 Lu Feifei, Paris, 2008
 Elsa Sahal, Fondation Ricard, Particules, 2008
 Wang Du, Transréalité, Kestnergesellschaft, Hanover, 2007
 Snaked trip & co, vers la ligne rose, Sylvain Paris, La Cinquième Couche, Brussels, 2007
 Philippe Jusforgues, Galerie 1900-2000, Paris, 2006
 Destination Luang Prabang, Somogy, Paris, 2006
 Eduardo Kac • Move 36, Filigranes Éditions, Paris, 2004 (edited by Elena Giuia Rosi, contributions and texts by: Elena Giuia Rosi, David Rosenberg, Frank Popper, Didier Ottinger, Linda Weintraub, Hugues Marchal)
 Prières, catalogue, Museum of Art and History of Saint-Denis and Somogy, Paris, 2002

References 

Place of birth missing (living people)
1965 births
Living people
French art curators
French male writers